Andiagana-Na is a village and seat of the commune of Dougoutene II in the Cercle of Koro in the Mopti Region of southern-central Mali.

References

Populated places in Mopti Region